Bulwell Forest is a tram stop on the Nottingham Express Transit (NET) light rail system in the city of Nottingham in the suburb of Bulwell. It is part of the NET's initial system, and is situated on the long single line section between Bulwell and Hucknall tram stops that runs alongside the Robin Hood railway line. Like all the other intermediate stops on this section, the stop has a passing loop with an island platform situated between the two tracks of the loop.

With the opening of NET's phase two, Bulwell Forest is now on NET line 1, which runs from Hucknall through the city centre to Beeston and Chilwell. Trams run at frequencies that vary between 4 and 8 trams per hour, depending on the day and time of day.

The Robin Hood line that passes alongside the stop was originally the former Midland Railway route from Nottingham to Worksop, but there has never been a railway station at the stop's location.

There is a road level crossing just to the south of the tram stop, and pedestrian access to the stop is from this crossing. At the crossing, both tram and railway lines are protected by the automatic barriers. The Springfield Retail Park, containing branches of Morrisons, Matalan, Wickes and Brantano, is adjacent to the tram stop.

References

External links

Nottingham Express Transit stops
Railway stations in Great Britain opened in 2004